Michael John Hebranko Jr. (May 14, 1953 – July 25, 2013) was an American man who suffered from an extreme case of morbid obesity and was one of the heaviest men in the world.

Hebranko was born in Brooklyn to Michael Hebranko Sr. and Jeanette Pica. His paternal grandfather was a Ukrainian immigrant.

After a stay at the St. Luke’s Hospital in New York City, he dropped his weight from 
He lost some of this weight from surgical removal of fat. He then toured the United States lecturing about his experiences and advocating dieting and exercise and appeared in infomercials promoting Richard Simmons. He also appeared on TV talk shows such as The Howard Stern Show, The Oprah Winfrey Show and the British chat show Wogan in 1990.

He died on July 25, 2013.

See also
 List of the heaviest people
 Obesity

References

1953 births
2013 deaths
Diet food advocates
People from Brooklyn
American people of Ukrainian descent
Obesity in the United States